Quarterpast is the debut album by Dutch metal supergroup MaYaN. It was released on 20 May 2011 in Europe. The title Quarterpast was suggested by a fan as part of a competition to decide the band's name, but was eventually used as the album title when the band decided to name themselves MaYaN.

Track listing

Personnel
Band members
Mark Jansen – death growls, screams, orchestral and lyrical arrangements
Jack Driessen – keyboards, screams, orchestral arrangements
Frank Schiphorst – guitars
Isaac Delahaye – guitars
Jeroen Paul Thesseling – fretless bass
Ariën van Weesenbeek – drums

Guest/session musicians
Floor Jansen - vocals on "Symphony of Aggression", "Course of Life", "Bite the Bullet", "Drown the Demon" and "Sinner's Last Retreat"
Simone Simons - vocals on "Symphony of Aggression", "Mainstay of Society", "Bite the Bullet", "Drown the Demon" and "Sinner's Last Retreat"
Henning Basse - vocals on "Symphony of Aggression", "Course of Life", "The Savage Massacre", "Bite the Bullet", "Celibate Aphrodite" and "Sinner's Last Retreat"
Laura Macrì - vocals on "The Savage Massacre", "Essenza di Te" and "Celibate Aphrodite"
Amanda Somerville - spoken word on "Symphony of Aggression", lyrics editing
Trinity Boys Choir - choir on "Quarterpast", arranged by Coen Janssen
MaYaN Choir:
Simone Simons, Floor Jansen, Laura Macrì - soprano and alto
Henning Basse, Simon Oberender - tenor and bass

Production
Sascha Paeth - producer, engineer, mixing, mastering
Simon Oberender, Olaf Reitmeier - engineers

References

2011 debut albums
Mayan (band) albums
Nuclear Blast albums